Boiga trigonata, commonly known as the Indian gamma snake or common cat snake, is a species of rear-fanged colubrid endemic to South Asia.

Description
See snake scales for terms used

B. trigonata has anterior palatine and mandibular teeth scarcely larger than the posterior. Its eyes are as long as the distance from its nostril; the rostral is broader than deep with the internasal scales shorter than the prefrontal scales. The frontal scales are longer than their distance from the end of the snout and shorter than the parietal scales. The loreals are as long as they are deep, or, they can be deeper than they are long. B. trigonata's one preocular does not extend to the upper surface of the head. The species has two postoculars, temporals 2+3, and 8 upper labials, with the third, fourth, and fifth entering the eye. They can have 4 or 5 lower labials in contact with the anterior chin-shields, which are about as long as the posterior. B. trigonatas body is moderately laterally compressed with smooth dorsal scales in 21 (or rarely 19) rows, with apical pits, disposed obliquely, with the vertebrals very feebly enlarged. There are 229-269 ventral scales, 79-92 divided subcaudal scales, and a single anal scale.

B. trigonata has a yellowish-olive or pale grey colour along the back and a white black-edged zigzag band along the length of the head with two brown bands edged with black, diverging posteriorly. The belly is white and can have a series of small brown spots along each side.

The total length is around 3 feet (91 cm) with a 7-inch (18 cm) tail.

Geographic range
B. trigonata is found in the Perso-Baluchistan frontier.

It is distributed throughout Sri Lanka, India, Pakistan, Nepal, Bangladesh, Afghanistan (Leviton 1959: 461), southern Turkmenistan, southern Uzbekistan, southeastern Tajikistan, and Iran.

The race melanocephala is found in Pakistan; this form is variously considered as a subspecies, color variant, or full species.

Mimicry

Boiga trigonata strongly resembles venomous Echis carinatus in coloration and shape. Also, in India, these two species have almost identical geographic ranges.

References

Further reading
Annandale, N. 1904. Additions to the Collection of Oriental Snakes in the Indian Museum. J. Asiat. Soc. Bengal  73: 207–211.
Gans, C., and M. Latifi. 1973. Another Case of Presumptive Mimicry in Snakes. Copeia 1973''' (4): 801–802.
Leviton, A.E. 1959. Systematics and Zoogeography of Philippine Snakes. Unpublished Ph.D. thesis.
Schneider, J.G. in Bechstein, J. M. 1802. Herrn de Lacépède's Naturgeschichte der Amphibien oder der eyerlegenden vierfüssigen Thiere und der Schlangen. Eine Fortsetzung von Buffon's Naturgeschichte aus dem Französischen übersetzt und mit Anmerkungen und Zusätzen versehen. Vierter Band [Volume 4]. Industrie Comptoir. Weimar. xx + 298 pp. + 48 plates. (Coluber trigonatus'', pp. 256–257 + Plate 40, Figure 1.)

External links
 
 Image
 Image

trigonata
Reptiles of Afghanistan
Reptiles of Central Asia
Reptiles of Iran
Reptiles of Pakistan
Reptiles of India
Reptiles described in 1802
Taxa named by Johann Gottlob Theaenus Schneider